Walter Steven DeKeseredy (born March 6, 1959) is the Anna Deane Carlson Endowed Chair of Social Sciences at West Virginia University, where he is also director of the Research Center on Violence and professor of sociology.

He received his Ph.D. from York University in 1988, and formerly taught at Carleton University. He is known for his research on violence against women, which he has been studying for more than thirty years. In particular, he is known for studying the role of threats to masculinity in male violence against women.

References

External links
Faculty page

1959 births
Living people
American criminologists
Academic staff of Carleton University
West Virginia University faculty
York University alumni